Tympanocryptis uniformis, the even-scaled earless dragon, is a species of agama found in Western Australia and the Northern Territory.

References

uniformis
Agamid lizards of Australia
Reptiles described in 1948
Taxa named by Francis John Mitchell